Dame Alice Ellen Terry,  (27 February 184721 July 1928), was a leading English actress of the late 19th and early 20th centuries.

Born into a family of actors, Terry began performing as a child, acting in Shakespeare plays in London, and toured throughout the British provinces in her teens. At 16, she married the 46-year-old artist George Frederic Watts, but they separated within a year. She soon returned to the stage but began a relationship with the architect Edward William Godwin and retired from the stage for six years. She resumed acting in 1874 and was immediately acclaimed for her portrayal of roles in Shakespeare and other classics.

In 1878 she joined Henry Irving's company as his leading lady, and for more than the next two decades she was considered the leading Shakespearean and comic actress in Britain. Two of her most famous roles were Portia in The Merchant of Venice and Beatrice in Much Ado About Nothing. She and Irving also toured with great success in America and Britain.

In 1903 Terry took over management of London's Imperial Theatre, focusing on the plays of George Bernard Shaw and Henrik Ibsen. The venture was a financial failure, and Terry turned to touring and lecturing. She continued to find success on stage until 1920, while also appearing in films from 1916 to 1922. Her career lasted nearly seven decades.

Early life and career 

Terry was born in Coventry, England, the third surviving child born into a theatrical family. Her parents, Benjamin (1818–1896), of Irish descent, and Sarah ( Ballard; 1819–1892), of Scottish ancestry, were comic actors in a Portsmouth-based touring company, (where Sarah's father was a Wesleyan minister) and had 11 children. At least five of them became actors: Kate, Ellen, Marion, Florence, and Fred. Two other children, George and Charles, were connected with theatre management. Kate (the grandmother of Val and John Gielgud) and Marion were particularly successful on stage.

Terry made her first stage appearance at age nine, as Mamillius, opposite Charles Kean as Leontes, in Shakespeare's The Winter's Tale at London's Princess's Theatre in 1856. She also played the roles of Puck in A Midsummer Night's Dream (1856), Prince Arthur in King John (1858), and Fleance in Macbeth (1859), continuing at the Princess's Theatre until the Keans' retirement in 1859. During the theatre's summer closures, Terry's father presented drawing-room entertainments at the Royal Colosseum, Regent's Park, London, and then on tour. In 1859, she appeared in the Tom Taylor comedy Nine Points of the Law at the Olympic Theatre. For the next two years, Terry and her sister Kate toured the British provinces in sketches and plays, accompanied by their parents and a musician.

Between 1861 and 1862, Terry was engaged by the Royalty Theatre in London, managed by Madame Albina de Rhona, where she acted with W. H. Kendal, Charles Wyndham and other rising actors. In 1862, she joined her sister Kate in J. H. Chute's stock company at the Theatre Royal, Bristol, where she played a wide variety of parts, including burlesque roles requiring singing and dancing, as well as roles in Much Ado About Nothing, Othello, and The Merchant of Venice. In 1863, Chute opened the Theatre Royal, Bath, where 15-year-old Terry appeared at the opening as Titania in A Midsummer Night's Dream, then returned to London to join J. B. Buckstone's company at the Haymarket Theatre in Shakespeare roles as well as Sheridan and modern comedies.

Watts, Godwin and return to acting

Terry married three times and was involved in numerous relationships. In London, during her engagement at the Haymarket Theatre, she and her sister Kate had their portraits painted by the eminent artist George Frederic Watts. His famous portraits of Terry include Choosing, in which she must select between earthly vanities, symbolised by showy but scentless camellias, and nobler values symbolised by humble-looking but fragrant violets. His other famous portraits of her include Ophelia and Watchman, and, with Kate, The Sisters. He proposed marriage to Terry in spite of his being three decades her senior. She was impressed with Watts's art and elegant lifestyle, and she wished to please her parents by making an advantageous marriage. She left the stage during the run of Tom Taylor's hit comedy Our American Cousin at the Haymarket, in which she played Mary Meredith.

Terry and Watts married on 20 February 1864 at St Barnabas, Kensington, seven days before her 17th birthday, when Watts was 46. She was uncomfortable in the role of child bride, and Watts's circle of admirers, including Mrs Prinsep, were not welcoming. Terry and Watts separated after only 10 months. However, during that short time, she had the opportunity to meet many cultured, talented and important people, such as poets Robert Browning and Alfred, Lord Tennyson; prime ministers William Ewart Gladstone and Benjamin Disraeli; and photographer Julia Margaret Cameron. Because of Watts's paintings of her and her association with him, she "became a cult figure for poets and painters of the later Pre-Raphaelite and Aesthetic movements, including Oscar Wilde".

She returned to acting by 1866. In 1867, Terry performed in several Tom Taylor pieces, including A Sheep in Wolf's Clothing at the Adelphi Theatre, The Antipodes at the Theatre Royal, Drury Lane, and Still Waters Run Deep at the Queen's Theatre, Long Acre. She would play there later that year for the first time opposite Henry Irving in the title roles of Katherine and Petruchio, David Garrick's one-act version of The Taming of the Shrew.

In 1868, despite her parents' objection, she began a relationship with the progressive architect-designer and essayist Edward William Godwin, another man whose taste she admired, whom she had met some years before. They retreated to Pigeonwick, a house in Harpenden, where she retired from acting for six years. Terry was still married to Watts, not finalising the divorce until 1877, so she and Godwin could not marry. However, they had a daughter, Edith Craig, in 1869 and a son, Edward Gordon Craig, in 1872. The surname Craig was chosen to avoid the stigma of illegitimacy, but their cohabitation and children born out of wedlock were considered scandalous at the time.

The relationship cooled in 1874 amid Godwin's preoccupation with his architectural practice and financial difficulties. However, even after their 1875 separation, Godwin continued to design Terry's costumes when she returned to the stage. In 1874 Terry played in several roles in Charles Reade's works: Philippa Chester in The Wandering Heir; Susan Merton in It's Never Too Late to Mend; and Helen Rolleston in Our Seamen. That same year she performed at the Crystal Palace with Charles Wyndham as Volante in The Honeymoon by John Tobin and as Kate Hardcastle in She Stoops to Conquer by Oliver Goldsmith.

Shakespeare, Irving, Lyceum

In 1875, Terry gave an acclaimed performance as Portia in The Merchant of Venice at the Prince of Wales's Theatre, produced by the Bancrofts. Oscar Wilde wrote a sonnet, upon seeing her in this role: "No woman Veronese looked upon/Was half so fair as thou whom I behold." She recreated this role many times in her career until her last appearance as Portia at London's Old Vic Theatre in 1917.

In 1876 she appeared as Lady Teazle in The School for Scandal, Blanche Haye in a revival of T. W. Robertson's Ours, and the title role in Olivia by William Gorman Wills at the Court Theatre (an adaptation of The Vicar of Wakefield), where she joined the company of John Hare. In November 1877 she married Charles Clavering Wardell (stage name Charles Kelly; 1839–1885), an actor/journalist she had met while appearing in Reade's plays, but they separated in 1881. After this, she finally reconciled with her parents, whom she had not seen since she began to live out-of-wedlock with Godwin.

In 1878 the 30-year-old Terry joined Henry Irving's company at the Lyceum Theatre as its leading lady at a generous salary, beginning with Ophelia opposite Irving's Hamlet. Soon she was regarded as the leading Shakespearean actress in Britain, and in partnership with Irving, she reigned as such for over 20 years until they left the Lyceum in 1902. Their 1879 production of The Merchant of Venice ran for an unusual 250 nights, and success followed success in the Shakespeare canon as well as in Tennyson, Bulwer-Lytton, Reade, Sardou, and plays by other contemporary playwrights, such as W. G. Wills, and other major plays.

In 1879 The Times said of Terry's acting in Paul Terrier's All is Vanity, or the Cynic's Defeat, "Miss Terry's Iris was a performance of inimitable charm, full of movement, ease, and laughter ... the most exquisite harmony and natural grace ... such an Iris might well have turned the head of Diogenes himself." In 1880, at the Lyceum, she played the title role in an adaptation of King René's Daughter called Iolanthe. The Era wrote: "Nothing more winning and enchanting than the grace, and simplicity, and girlish sweetness of the blind Iolanthe as shown by Miss Ellen Terry has within our memory been seen upon the stage. The assumption was delightfully perfect. ... Exquisite ... exercise of the peculiarly fascinating powers of Miss Ellen Terry, who achieved an undoubted triumph ... and was cheered again and again".

Among her most celebrated roles with Irving were Ophelia, Pauline in The Lady of Lyons by Edward Bulwer-Lytton (1878), Portia (1879), Queen Henrietta Maria in William Gorman Wills's drama Charles I (1879), Desdemona in Othello (1881), Camma in Tennyson's short tragedy The Cup (1881), Beatrice in Much Ado About Nothing, another of her signature roles (1882 and often thereafter), Juliet in Romeo and Juliet (1882), Jeanette in The Lyons Mail (1883), the title part in Reade's romantic comedy Nance Oldfield (1883), Viola in Twelfth Night (1884), Margaret in the long-running adaptation of Faust by Wills (1885), the title role in Olivia (1885, which she had played earlier at the Court Theatre), Lady Macbeth in Macbeth (1888, with incidental music by Arthur Sullivan), Queen Katherine in Henry VIII (1892), Cordelia in King Lear (1892), Rosamund de Clifford in Becket by Alfred Tennyson (1893), Guinevere in King Arthur by J. Comyns Carr, with incidental music by Sullivan (1895), Imogen in Cymbeline (1896), the title character in Victorien Sardou and Émile Moreau's play Madame Sans-Gêne (1897) and Volumnia in Coriolanus (1901).

Terry made her American debut in 1883, playing Queen Henrietta opposite Irving in Charles I. Among the other roles she portrayed on this and six subsequent North American tours with Irving were Jeanette, Ophelia, Beatrice, Viola, and her most famous role, Portia. Her last role at the Lyceum was Portia in 1902, after which she toured in the British provinces with Irving and his company that autumn. Whether Irving's relationship with Terry was romantic as well as professional has been the subject of much speculation. According to Sir Michael Holroyd's book about Irving and Terry, A Strange Eventful History, after Irving's death, Terry stated that she and Irving had been lovers and that: "We were terribly in love for a while". Irving was separated, but not divorced from his wife. Terry had separated from Wardell in 1881, and Irving was godfather to both her children. They travelled on holiday together, and Irving wrote tender letters to Terry.

In London, Terry lived in Earls Court with her children and pets during the 1880s, first in Longridge Road, then Barkston Gardens in 1889, but she kept country homes. In 1900, she bought her farmhouse in Small Hythe, Kent, where she lived for the rest of her life. In 1889, her son joined the Lyceum company as an actor, appearing with the company until 1897, when he retired from the stage to study drawing and produce woodblock engravings. Her daughter Edith also played at the Lyceum for several years from 1887, but she eventually turned to stage direction and costume design, creating costumes for Terry, Lillie Langtry, and others early in the 20th century.

Shaw, Ibsen, Barrie

In 1902 Terry played Mistress Page in The Merry Wives of Windsor, with Herbert Beerbohm Tree as Falstaff and Madge Kendal as Mistress Ford. In the 1890s, Terry had struck up a friendship and conducted a famous correspondence with George Bernard Shaw, who wished to begin a theatrical venture with her. In 1903, Terry formed a new theatrical company, taking over management of the Imperial Theatre with her son, after her business partner Irving ended his tenure at the Lyceum in 1902. Here she had complete artistic control and could choose the works in which she would appear, as Irving had done at the Lyceum. The new venture focused on the plays of Shaw and Henrik Ibsen, including the latter's The Vikings in 1903, with Terry as the warlike Hiordis, a misjudged role for her. Theatre management turned out to be a financial failure for Terry, who had hoped the venture would showcase her son's set design and directing talents and her daughter's costume designs. She then toured England, taking engagements in Nottingham, Liverpool, and Wolverhampton, and created the title role in 1905 in J. M. Barrie's Alice-Sit-by-the-Fire at the Duke of York's Theatre. Irving died in 1905, and the distraught Terry briefly left the stage.

She returned to the theatre in April 1906, playing Lady Cecily Wayneflete to acclaim in Shaw's Captain Brassbound's Conversion at the Court Theatre and touring successfully in that role in Britain and America. On 12 June 1906, her golden jubilee was commemorated by a star-studded gala performance at the Drury Lane Theatre, for Terry's benefit, at which Enrico Caruso sang, W. S. Gilbert directed a performance of Trial by Jury, Eleonora Duse, Mrs. Patrick Campbell, Lillie Langtry, Herbert Beerbohm Tree, Nellie Melba, and more than 20 members of Terry's family performed an act of Much Ado about Nothing with her, among other performances. The benefit raised £6,000 for Terry. She next appeared at His Majesty's Theatre as Hermione in Tree's production of The Winter's Tale. In 1907 she toured America in Captain Brassbound's Conversion under the direction of Charles Frohman. During that tour, on 22 March 1907, she married her co-star, American James Carew, who had appeared with her at the Court Theatre. He was 30 years her junior, and the couple separated after two years, although they never divorced. Her acting career continued strongly.

In 1908 she was back at His Majesty's, playing Aunt Imogen in W. Graham Robertson's fairy play Pinkie and the Fairies. She played Nance Oldfield in a A Pageant of Great Women written in 1909 by Cicely Hamilton and directed by Terry's daughter Edith Craig. In 1910 she toured in the provinces (with Archibald Joyce) and then in the US with much success, acting, giving recitations and lecturing on the Shakespeare heroines. Returning to England, she played roles such as Nell Gwynne in The First Actress (1911) by Christopher St. John (a pseudonym for Christabel Marshall), one of the first productions of the Pioneer Players theatre society, founded in 1911 by Craig and for which Ellen Terry served as President. Also in 1911, she recorded scenes from five Shakespeare roles for the Victor Talking Machine Company, which are the only known recordings of her voice. In 1914 to 1915, Terry toured Australasia, the US and Britain, again reciting and lecturing on the Shakespeare heroines. While in the US, she underwent an operation for the removal of cataracts from both eyes, but the operation was only partly successful. In 1916, she played Darling in Barrie's The Admirable Crichton (1916). During World War I she performed in many war benefits.

Films and last years
In 1916 she appeared in her first film as Julia Lovelace in Her Greatest Performance and continued to act in London and on tour, also making a few more films through 1922, including Victory and Peace (1918), Pillars of Society (1920), Potter's Clay (1922), and The Bohemian Girl (1922) as Buda the nursemaid, with Ivor Novello and Gladys Cooper. During this time, she continued to lecture on Shakespeare throughout England and North America. She also gave scenes from Shakespeare plays in music halls under the management of Oswald Stoll. Her last fully staged role was as the Nurse in Romeo and Juliet at the Lyric Theatre on Shaftesbury Avenue in 1919.

In 1920 she retired from the stage and in 1922 from film. She returned to play Susan Wildersham in Walter de la Mare's fairy play, Crossings, in November 1925 at the Lyric Hammersmith.

In 1922 the University of St Andrews conferred an honorary LLD upon Terry, and in 1925 she was appointed Dame Grand Cross of the Order of the British Empire by King George V, only the second actress, after Geneviève Ward, to be created a dame for her professional achievements. In her last years, she gradually lost her eyesight and suffered from senility. Stephen Coleridge anonymously published an annotated volume of his correspondence with Terry, The Heart of Ellen Terry, in 1928.

Death and legacy
On 21 July 1928, Terry died of a cerebral haemorrhage at her home at Smallhythe Place, near Tenterden, Kent, aged 81. Her son Edward later recalled, "Mother looked 30 years old ... a young beautiful woman lay on the bed, like Juliet on her bier". Margaret Winser created a death mask. Terry was cremated at Golders Green Crematorium. Her ashes are kept in a silver chalice on the right side of the chancel of the actors' church, St Paul's, Covent Garden, London, where a memorial tablet was unveiled by Sir John Martin-Harvey.

After her death, the Ellen Terry Memorial Museum was founded by Edith Craig in her mother's memory at Smallhythe Place, an early 16th-century house that she bought at the turn of the 20th century. The museum was taken over by the National Trust in 1947.

Terry's daughter Edith Craig became a theatre director, producer, costume designer, and an early pioneer of the women's suffrage movement in England. Terry's son, Edward Gordon Craig, became an actor, scenery and effects designer, illustrator, and director; he also founded the Gordon Craig School for the Art of the Theatre in Florence, Italy, in 1913. The actor John Gielgud was her great-nephew. Illustrator Helen Craig is Terry's great-granddaughter.

An archive of Ellen Terry memorabilia is held by Coventry University, which also has an Ellen Terry Building, the former Odeon cinema in Jordan's Well.

Gallery

See also 
 Neilson–Terry Guild of Dramatic Art
 Terry family

Notes

References

Sources 
 Auerbach, Nina. Ellen Terry: Player in Her Time (1987) W. W. Norton; (1997) University of Pennsylvania Press 
 
 Cockin, Katharine. Edith Craig (1869–1947): Dramatic Lives (1998) Cassell.
 
 Cockin, Katharine (ed.) Ellen Terry, Spheres of Influence (2011) Pickering & Chatto.
 Cockin, Katharine (ed.) Ellen Terry: Lives of the Shakespearian Actors (2012) Pickering & Chatto.
 Cockin, Katherine (ed.) The Collected Letters of Ellen Terry, Vol. 6, London: Pickering & Chatto (2015)  
 "Drama: This Week", The Athenæum, 19 January 1895, p. 93.
 Foulkes, Richard ed. Henry Irving: A Re-evaluation, (2008) London: Ashgate.
 Gielgud, John. An Actor and His Time, Sidgwick and Jackson, London, 1979. 
 Goodman, Jennifer R. "The Last of Avalon: Henry Irving's King Arthur of 1895", Harvard Library Bulletin, 32.3 (Summer 1984) pp. 239–55.
 Hartnoll, Phyllis and Peter Found, The Concise Oxford Companion to the Theatre. (1992) Oxford University Press 
 Holroyd, Michael. A Strange Eventful History, Farrar Straus Giroux, 2008. 
 
 Manvell, Roger. Ellen Terry. New York: G. P. Putnam's Sons, 1968.
 Melville, Joy. Ellen and Edy. London: Pandora, 1987.
 Parker, J. ed., Who's Who in the Theatre, 11th edn (1952)
 Prideaux, Tom. Love or Nothing: The Life and Times of Ellen Terry (1976) Scribner.
 Scott, Clement. Ellen Terry (1900) New York: Frederick A. Stokes Company, 1900.
 Shearer, Moira. Ellen Terry (1998) Sutton.
 Stoker, Bram. Personal Reminiscences of Henry Irving, 2 vols. (1906)

Biographies and correspondence
 Cheshire, David F. Portrait of Ellen Terry (1989) Amber Lane Press, 
 Cockin, Katharine (ed). The Collected Letters of Ellen Terry (2010–2017; 8 volumes) London: Pickering & Chatto.
 Craig, E. G. Ellen Terry and Her Secret Self (1932)
 Ellen Terry and Bernard Shaw: A Correspondence (1931); and The Shaw-Terry Letters: A Romantic Correspondence (both edited by Christopher St. John)
 The Heart of Ellen Terry (1928) Ed. Stephen Coleridge [anon.] London; Mills & Boon, Ltd.
 Fecher, Constance. Bright Star: a Portrait of Ellen Terry (1970)
 Hiatt, C. Ellen Terry and her Impersonations (1908)
 Pemberton, Thomas Edgar. Ellen Terry and Her Sisters, London: C.A. Pearson (1902)
 R. Manvell, Ellen Terry (1968)
 St John, Christopher. Ellen Terry (1907)
  (1908) London: Hutchinson & Co; (1982) Schocken Books

External links 

 
 
 
 
 Profile and photos of Terry, University of Rochester
 Photos and links to Terry information at the Stage Beauty website
 Terry bibliography
 Paintings and other images of Terry  at the National Portrait Gallery
 Photos of Terry's home at Smallhythe and of Terry, National Trust
 
 The Ellen Terry Collection held by the Victoria and Albert Museum Theatre and Performance Department.
Victor Catalog listing of recitals by Ellen Terry

1847 births
1928 deaths
19th-century English actresses
20th-century English actresses
Actresses awarded damehoods
Actresses from Coventry
Actresses from Kent
Dames Grand Cross of the Order of the British Empire
English film actresses
English people of Scottish descent
English Shakespearean actresses
English silent film actresses
English stage actresses
People from Tenterden
Terry family
Women of the Victorian era